The Moog Cookbook is the debut record by the American electronic music duo the Moog Cookbook, released on May 7, 1996. It consists of ten cover versions of alternative rock tracks performed using Moog synthesizers and other analog synthesizers. The album was critically acclaimed and became an underground hit. In 1997, it was followed by the similar Ye Olde Space Bande.

Track listing

References

1996 debut albums
The Moog Cookbook albums
Restless Records albums
Covers albums